Flushing Cemetery is a cemetery in Flushing in the borough of Queens in New York City, New York.

History 
Flushing Cemetery has several predecessors.  In the year 1789 (64 years before the cemetery was founded), George Washington had crossed the East River on a personal mission aboard his barge. Washington, like other noted landowners, journeyed to Flushing: The community was a center of scientific horticulture. The cemetery's floral and arboreal beauty have become a memorial to Flushing's status as a center of horticulture to this day.

During the year of 1853 in which the Flushing Cemetery was founded, the population of Queens County was around 20,000. The land the original site for Flushing Cemetery would rest was the 20-acre John Purchase farm, which was selected by committee. A select number of individuals who attended the founding meeting: Reverend John Gilder, Henry Christie, William Leonard, Caleb Smith, and Robert B. Parsons. Civic-minded citizens like these people had also organized the Flushing Cemetery Association. The day these founders received their charter was May 5, 1853 was the same day in which the World's Fair in New York Crystal Palace was scheduled to open. Civil engineer Horace Daniels was responsible for plotting the grounds. In 1875, the Whitehead Duryea farm, which measured 50 acres and adjoined the cemetery, was purchased and added to the site.

The Bayside Quakers and some of their relatives and neighbors, in about 1860, brought a half-acre within this cemetery in the western half of section I. Section I, which is also referred to as the Quaker Burial Place of Flushing, is where 43 people (the largest in one group) are buried, while 109 were buried in Flushing Cemetery.

The Flushing Cemetery, where 41,000 bodies are buried and thousands more with reservations, has flowers, trees, and greenswards. Roland Schultheis, a scholarly man, became the keeper of the Flushing Cemetery and took great pride in caring for it.

The preservation of the cemetery has also been regarded as a significant task. Individuals with both intelligence and distinguished family backgrounds have preserved its unusual beauty. The cemetery's manager Roland Schultheis was a descendant of the Schultheis Brothers who were internationally famous with their nurseries in Frankfurt, Germany, the largest in Europe: It is possible that Shultheis' ancestors were buried in this cemetery.

Burials
 Louis Armstrong (1901–1971), musician and singer
 Bernard Baruch (1870–1965), financier, after whom Baruch College is named
 Laurie Bird (1952–1979), a film actress and photographer
 Eugene Bullard (1895–1961), the first African-American military pilot
 Ellis Parker Butler (1869–1937), author of Pigs is Pigs
 Adam Clayton Powell, Sr. (1865–1953), cleric
 Charles S. Colden (1885–1960), lawyer, Queens County District Attorney, and New York Supreme Court Justice
 Joseph Fitch (1857–1917), lawyer, assemblyman, and city magistrate
 Dizzy Gillespie (1917–1993), jazz trumpet player
 Hermann Grab, writer
 Johnny Hodges, long-time Ellington band sideman and soloist
 Thomas Birdsall Jackson, United States Congressman
 Jan Matulka, Modern artist
 Lemuel E. Quigg, United States Representative from New York
 May Robson (1858–1942), actress
 Aris San, Greek singer who spent most of his life in Israel and United States.
 Vincent Sardi Sr., founder of Sardi's restaurant.
 Hazel Scott (1920–1981), musician and singer
 Charlie Shavers, jazz trumpet player
 Battling Siki (1897–1925), boxer, remains repatriated to Senegal
 Frederic Storm (1844–1935), US Representative for New York (1901–03)

References

External links
 Official Website
 Interment data for Flushing Cemetery

Cemeteries in Queens, New York
Flushing, Queens